Novy Tamyan (Yañı Tamyan) is a rural locality (a village) in Bazgiyevsky Selsoviet, Sharansky District, Bashkortostan, Russia. The population was 173 as of 2010. There is 1 street.

Geography 
Novy Tamyan is located 17 km southeast of Sharan (the district's administrative centre) by road. Bazgiyevo is the nearest rural locality.

References 

Rural localities in Sharansky District